The Ștefan Lupașcu Institute of European Studies is a private university in Iaşi, Romania. Founded in 1999, it was named in honor of the Romanian philosopher Stéphane Lupasco.

Structure
 Public Administration
 Management
 Accounting and Information Systems

References

External links

 Official site

Universities in Iași
Educational institutions established in 1999
1999 establishments in Romania